November 29 - Eastern Orthodox liturgical calendar - December 1

All fixed commemorations below are observed on December 13 by Eastern Orthodox Churches on the Old Calendar.

For November 30, Orthodox Churches on the Old Calendar commemorate the Saints listed on November 17.

Saints

 Holy and All-Praised Apostle Andrew the First-Called (62)
 Saint Frumentius, Archbishop of Abyssinia (380)
 Saint Alexander of Methymna, Wonderworker, first Bishop of Methymna on Lesbos and a member of the First Ecumenical Council (c. 325)
 Saints Peter I (5th century) and Samuel I (5th-6th centuries), Catholicoi of Georgia.
 Saint Vakhtang Gorgasali, King of Georgia (502)

Pre-Schism Western saints

 Saints Castulus and Euprepis, martyrs in Rome.
 Saint Constantius, a priest in Rome who opposed the Pelagians and at whose hands he suffered a great deal (5th century)
 Saint Trojanus of Saintes (Troyen), a priest in Saintes in France where he later became bishop after St Vivien (533)
 Saint Tudwal (Tugdual), Bishop in Wales and Brittany (c. 564)

Post-Schism Orthodox saints

 Saint Andrew (Saguna), Metropolitan of Transylvania (1873)
 Saint Elias, Schemamonk of Valaam and Verkhoturye (1900)

New martyrs and confessors

 New Hieromartyr John Chestnov, Priest (1937)

Icon gallery

Notes

References

Sources
 November 30 / December 13. Orthodox Calendar (PRAVOSLAVIE.RU).
 December 13 / November 30. Holy Trinity Russian Orthodox Church (A parish of the Patriarchate of Moscow).
 November 30. OCA - The Lives of the Saints.
 The Autonomous Orthodox Metropolia of Western Europe and the Americas (ROCOR). St. Hilarion Calendar of Saints for the year of our Lord 2004. St. Hilarion Press (Austin, TX). p. 89.
 The Thirtieth Day of the Month of November. Orthodoxy in China.
 November 30. Latin Saints of the Orthodox Patriarchate of Rome.
 The Roman Martyrology. Transl. by the Archbishop of Baltimore. Last Edition, According to the Copy Printed at Rome in 1914. Revised Edition, with the Imprimatur of His Eminence Cardinal Gibbons. Baltimore: John Murphy Company, 1916. p. 369.
 Rev. Richard Stanton. A Menology of England and Wales, or, Brief Memorials of the Ancient British and English Saints Arranged According to the Calendar, Together with the Martyrs of the 16th and 17th Centuries. London: Burns & Oates, 1892. pp. 572-574.
Greek Sources
 Great Synaxaristes:  30 ΝΟΕΜΒΡΙΟΥ. ΜΕΓΑΣ ΣΥΝΑΞΑΡΙΣΤΗΣ.
  Συναξαριστής. 30 Νοεμβρίου. ECCLESIA.GR. (H ΕΚΚΛΗΣΙΑ ΤΗΣ ΕΛΛΑΔΟΣ). 
Russian Sources
  13 декабря (30 ноября). Православная Энциклопедия под редакцией Патриарха Московского и всея Руси Кирилла (электронная версия). (Orthodox Encyclopedia - Pravenc.ru).
  30 ноября (ст.ст.) 13 декабря 2014 (нов. ст.). Русская Православная Церковь Отдел внешних церковных связей. (DECR).
  30 ноября по старому стилю / 13 декабря по новому стилю. Русская Православная Церковь - Православный церковный календарь на 2018 год.

November in the Eastern Orthodox calendar